Hume Township is located in Whiteside County, Illinois. As of the 2010 census, its population was 411 and it contained 194 housing units.

Geography

Demographics

References

External links
City-data.com
Whiteside County Official Site

Townships in Whiteside County, Illinois
Townships in Illinois